MVAC can refer to :
 Anti-Communist Volunteer Militia
 MVAC chemotherapy regimen of (methotrexate, vinblastine, adriamycin and cisplatin)
 MVAC mechanical ventilation and air conditioning
 MVAC Motor Vehicle Asset Communicator
 MVac Merlin Vacuum (1C)

 MVAC Moscow Vascular Anomalies Clinic mvac.ru